is the second studio album by Japanese singer-songwriter Miyuki Nakajima, released in October 1976.

Track listing
All songs written and composed by Miyuki Nakajima.
"" -2:56
"" - 4:07
"" 3:49
"" - 5:01
"" - 3:57
"" -3:32
"" - 2:41
"" [Album Version] - 4:19
"" - 2:47
"" - 2:30
"" -2:17
"" - 3:40

Chart positions
Chart - Oricon (Japan)

Miyuki Nakajima albums
1976 albums
Pony Canyon albums